Alexander Maximiliano Silva Garrel (born 14 November 1990) is an Uruguayan footballer who plays for C.A. Progreso.

Career

Club career
In January 2020, Silva moved to C.A. Progreso.

References

External links
 
 

1990 births
Living people
Uruguayan footballers
Uruguayan expatriate footballers
Central Español players
Villa Española players
Boston River players
Oriental players
Ñublense footballers
Parrillas One players
Montevideo City Torque players
Rampla Juniors players
Quilmes Atlético Club footballers
Club Atlético Fénix players
C.A. Progreso players
Uruguayan Primera División players
Uruguayan Segunda División players
Primera B de Chile players
Primera Nacional players
Footballers from Montevideo
Association football forwards
Uruguayan expatriate sportspeople in Honduras
Uruguayan expatriate sportspeople in Chile
Uruguayan expatriate sportspeople in Argentina
Expatriate footballers in Honduras
Expatriate footballers in Chile
Expatriate footballers in Argentina